The Libertarian Party Mises Caucus (LPMC) is a caucus within the United States Libertarian Party that promotes paleolibertarianism and a more radical version of libertarianism associated with the presidential campaigns of Ron Paul. It was founded in 2017 by Michael Heise, mainly in opposition to Nicholas Sarwark's position as party chairman, and the more pragmatic faction of the party associated with the presidential campaigns of Gary Johnson. It is named after classical liberal economist Ludwig von Mises.

The caucus has support of some prominent libertarians, such as comedian Dave Smith, political commentator Tom Woods, and radio host Scott Horton. Ron Paul himself once called the caucus "the libertarian wing of the Libertarian Party". As of 2022, the Mises Caucus is the largest caucus of the Libertarian Party, with their caucus controlling all leadership positions on the Libertarian National Committee, as well as 37 state affiliates.

History

2017–2018 
In August 2017, a feud between the Libertarian National Committee and the Mises Institute occurred in the aftermath of the Unite the Right rally. LNC chairman Nicholas Sarwark criticized Mises Institute President Jeff Deist for an article he wrote for the think tank weeks before the rally that positively mentioned the term "blood and soil," and criticized Tom Woods for defending Murray Rothbard's paleo strategy. Other members of the LNC called the Mises Institute "white nationalist" and said "there's no room for bigots and racists in the party". Along with strong anti-Bill Weld sentiment in the party, and many Ron Paul supporters believing the Libertarian Party became more politically correct and pro-identity politics, this all led to the formation and rise of the Mises Caucus.

In late 2017, the newly-formed caucus reached out to the chairman of the 2018 LP Convention Committee, Daniel Hayes, entertaining the idea of Ron Paul and Judge Napolitano speaking at the 2018 Libertarian National Convention. Hayes rejected the idea, claiming Ron Paul doesn't represent the party's values. Ron Paul confronted the controversy, stating he has been a lifetime member of the Libertarian Party since 1987 when he paid using a gold coin, and asked, "do I get my gold coin back?". Sarwark later said in a tweet: "If Ron Paul decides he wants to attend the Libertarian Party national convention in New Orleans and speak, I'll make sure he gets time on the stage. It's the least we can do for a life member, former Presidential nominee, and Hall of Liberty award winner."

In February 2018, the Mises Caucus endorsed LNC At-large member Joshua Smith in the 2018 party chair election, but later ended up losing to incumbent Sarwark 65–22%.

2019–2021 
In 2019, the Mises Caucus launched a political action committee, Mises PAC, to raise money for Libertarian candidates.

The caucus supported Jacob Hornberger's campaign in the 2020 Libertarian Party presidential primaries. Hornberger came in second behind nominee Jo Jorgensen at the 2020 Libertarian National Convention.

The caucus once again endorsed Joshua Smith for party chairman, but lost to Joe Bishop-Henchman.

In June 2021, the Mises-controlled New Hampshire affiliate made controversial tweets calling for "legalizing child labor", repealing the Civil Rights Act of 1964, and re-opening Gitmo "so that Anthony Fauci and every governor that locked their state down can be sent there". LPNH Chair Jilletta Jarvis in response took control of the state party's digital assets and Twitter account and disavowed the Mises Caucus members of the state party committee. This move was widely condemned by many in the caucus, and some in the party outside the caucus, including 2020 VP nominee Spike Cohen and former U.S congressman Justin Amash. LNC Chair Bishop-Henchman moved for the LNC to disaffiliate LPNH, alleging that the Mises faction had violated the national party's Statement of Principles. Both Jarvis and Bishop-Henchman resigned from their positions after the LNC rejected the disaffiliation motion.

2022 Takeover of the LNC 
In 2021, Mises Caucus board member Angela McArdle announced her intention to run for party chair. She was later endorsed by the caucus. At the 2022 Libertarian National Convention on May 28, McArdle won the LNC Chair election with over 69% of the vote, as well as the caucus sweeping all LNC positions, completing the takeover of the Libertarian Party by the Mises Caucus.

In Response to the Mises Caucus Controlled LNC, the Libertarian Party affiliates in the States of New Mexico, Virginia, and Massachusetts disaffiliated from the National Libertarian Party, and in late 2022 formed the Association of Liberty State Parties.

Political positions

Platform 
The Mises Caucus claims in their platform that they

 support private property rights and reject socialism
 support the Austrian School of economics
 reject mainstream monetary policies, such as central banking and state-issued currency
 support decentralization, including secession and localism, "all the way down to the individual"
 support non-interventionist foreign policy and opposition to war
 reject identity politics as "weaponized tribal collectivism that is antithetical to individualism"

Other positions

Party "Takeover" 
The Mises Caucus has been highly critical of the Libertarian National Committee and the pragmatic faction of the party, and states their goal is to "takeover" the Libertarian Party and realign it closer to Ron Paul's presidential campaigns and the Mises Institute. The caucus has accused many in the party of supporting political correctness and "wokeism" and being "SJW friendly".

Angela McArdle, a board member of the Mises Caucus, said in 2021 that the party should be ideologically closer to Ron Paul than Gary Johnson, and that Johnson didn't "put a fire in anyone's hearts".

COVID-19 
During the COVID-19 pandemic, the caucus strongly opposed lockdowns, mask mandates, vaccine passports and vaccine mandates. The Mises Caucus also criticized the wider party for being silent and "not taking a stand".

Political activity

Inside the Libertarian Party

2020

U.S. President

Criticism 
The Mises Caucus has been highly controversial within and outside the Libertarian Party. The caucus has been accused of harboring racists, anti-semites, and transphobes. The caucus strongly denies these claims.

In his resignation letter as LNC chair, Bishop-Henchman accused the Mises Caucus of having a "toxic culture" and "bad actors" that is "destroying and driving people away from the party". In June 2021, former congressman Justin Amash criticized the Mises-controlled New Hampshire affiliate for "edgelording" and being unprofessional in their messaging.

Former New Hampshire legislator Caleb Dryer criticized the caucus for claiming neutrality in the culture war "while picking the right-wing side", and called it disingenuous.

In December 2021, Jeremy Thompson, Libertarian Party of Massachusetts Director of Operations explained to the Libertarian National Committee how the comments from Mises-controlled Libertarian Party of New Hampshire were not just "mean words" but “actual harassment”.

In May 2022, the Southern Poverty Law Center claimed "Members of the Libertarian Party are concerned about the Mises Caucus winning control of the party at the May 26 national convention, ushering in an era of collaboration between the U.S.'s largest third party and the hard-right movement inside the Republican Party”. The SPLC also claimed Caucus chair and founder Michael Heise took donations from Patrick M. Byrne and endorsed Daryl Brooks for Governor of Pennsylvania. Both Byrne and Brooks promoted the alleged conspiracy theory that the 2020 presidential election was stolen from Donald Trump.

Notes

References

External links 
 
 Mises PAC profile at the Federal Election Commission

Libertarian Party (United States) organizations
Libertarian Party (United States) caucuses
Anarcho-capitalism in the United States
United States political action committees
2017 establishments in the United States
Ron Paul
Political controversies in the United States
Secessionist organizations in the United States